The Minolta RD-175 was an early digital SLR, introduced in 1995. Minolta combined an existing SLR with a three way splitter and three separate CCD image sensors, giving 1.75 megapixel (MP) resolution. The base of the DSLR was the Minolta Maxxum 500si Super (the Dynax 500si Super in Europe and as Alpha 303si Super in Asia). Agfa produced a version of the RD-175 retailed as the Agfa ActionCam.

The RD-175 was also notable as the first consumer digital camera to be used professionally, being used to create the full-motion claymation adventure video game The Neverhood.

Technology
Since state of the art CCD resolution at the time was not sufficient for Minolta, the light entering the central 12 mm × 16 mm area of the RD-175's focal plane was compressed by 0.4x relay optics behind the focal plane, similar to the optical reduction system used in the Nikon E series. The light bundled on the smaller sensor area increased the effective sensitivity (ISO) by  stops. Then the light was split and sent to three separate 4.8 × 6.4 mm sized 768 × 494 pixel (3 × 0.38 MP) image sensors, two used for green and one for the red and blue color, reducing the sensitivity increase to about 2 stops. The only usable ISO was 800.

The three images were combined digitally and interpolated to the final size of 1.75 MP (1528 × 1146 pixels). Images were stored on an internal PCMCIA hard drive. The camera used Minolta AF A-mount lenses with a crop factor of 2.

See also
 Telecompressor

References

External links
 Minolta RD-175 on The Digital Camera Museum
 RD-175/Agfa ActionCam review by John Henshall
 Agfa ActionCam on Jarle Aasland's NikonWeb.com site
 Example images at Pbase.com
 Retrospective Review video on YouTube by V Nemeth

175
RD-175